桂 (pinyin: guì, Japanese: kei or katsura) may refer to:

The abbreviation for Guangxi
Gui (surname)
Cercidiphyllum japonicum, known in Japanese as katsura
Guilin province
Japanese destroyer Katsura

See also
 Gui (disambiguation)
 Kei (disambiguation)
 Katsura (disambiguation)